Juanlu is the name of:

Juanlu (footballer, born 1972), Juan Luis Bernal Cuéllar, Spanish football defender
Juanlu (footballer, born 1980), Juan Luis López Gómez, Spanish football midfielder
Juanlu (footballer, born 1984), Juan Luis Hens Lorite, Spanish football midfielder
Juanlu (footballer, born 2003), Juan Luis Sánchez Velasco, Spanish football forward